Guru Shikhar, a peak in the Arbuda Mountains of Sirohi district in Rajasthan, is the highest point of the Aravalli Range and Rajasthan. It is 75 km from Sirohi city, the district headquarter and 15 km from Mount Abu and a road from there leads almost to the top of the mountain. It is named Guru-Shikhar or 'the peak of the guru' after Dattatreya, an incarnation of Vishnu, and of a cave at the summit contains a temple dedicated to him, plus one dedicated his mother, Anasuya, wife of sage Atri nearby.

Adjacent to the temple is the Mt Abu Observatory operated by the Physical Research Laboratory. This observatory hosts a 1.2m infrared telescope and also several Astronomy experiments.

Mythological history 

In this mythological history, the name of goddess Anusuya and her husband, Atri, is primarily recorded as wife and husband.
It is a matter of time that Mother Anasuya Trideva became absorbed in the strictest tenacity for obtaining a son like Brahma, Vishnu, Mahesh, which made Saraswati, Lakshmi and Parvati feel uneasy, the wife goddesses of the three Gods.

The three said to their husbands that they should go to the people and go there and take the examination of Goddess Anusuya. At the behest of Brahma, Vishnu, and Mahesh Sannyasis, the people of the earth went to take a test of the ascetic Goddess Anusuya. Tried to go near the sannyasi, Tridev asked him to beg, but he had a condition too.

To take the examination of the favor of Anusuya, Tridev told them that he had come to ask for alms but he should not go begging in his normal form but in the nude state of Anusuya. Artha Devi Anusuya will be able to give them an alms only when she is naked in front of Tridev Please listen to this. After listening to this story, the disciplined first started fluttering but after a little bit of rehearsing, Defining water poured on three monks.

When the water sprinkled, Brahma, Vishnu, Mahesh all changed into infant form. After taking the baby form, Anusuya breastfed them as a beggar. When Anushuya's husband Atri came back home, Anusuya called them the secret of three children. Atri had already seen the entire development with his divine vision. Atri embraced the three children and with their power, they converted three children into one child, with three heads and six hands.

Due to Brahma,Yes Vishnu, Mahesh's not returning to heaven, his wives became worried and came to Goddess Aasuya himself. Saraswati, Lakshmi, Parvati urged them to give back their respective husbands. Anusuya and her husband accepted the suggestion of the three ladies and Tridev came into their real form. After being pleased and impressed by Anusuya and Atri, Tridev gave them Dattatreya's son as a gift, which was the embodiment of these three gods. Dattatreya's body was one but he had three heads and six arms. Dattatreya, in particular, is considered to be the incarnation of Vishnu.

Dattatreya's other two brothers were Chandra Deva and Rishi Durvasha. Brahma and Rishi Durvasha are considered to be the form of Shiva to the Moon.

On the day Dattatreya was born, people of Hindu religion celebrate that day as Dattatreya Jayanti.

References 

Mountains of Rajasthan
Hill stations in Rajasthan
Mount Abu
Highest points of Indian states and union territories
Aravalli Range
Tourism in Mount Abu